Louis Guglielmi (3 April 1916 – 4 April 1991), known by his pen name Louiguy, was a Spanish-born French musician of Italian descent. He wrote the melody for Édith Piaf's lyrics of "La Vie en Rose" and the Latin jazz composition "Cerisier rose et pommier blanc", a popular song written in 1950, made famous in English as "Cherry Pink (and Apple Blossom White)", which was recast as a resounding mambo hit for Pérez Prado.

Guglielmi was born in Barcelona. He studied music at the Conservatoire de Paris in the same class as Maurice Baquet, Henri Betti, Paul Bonneau and Henri Dutilleux. He created almost three dozen film scores, beginning in 1946 with La Rose de la mer and including Mourir d'aimer (1970; in English To Die of Love). Among the last was the score for Jean Gabin's final gangster flick, Verdict (1974). He died in Vence, one day after his 75th birthday.

Selected filmography
 The Heroic Monsieur Boniface (1949)
 The Treasure of Cantenac (1950)
 The Atomic Monsieur Placido (1950)
 Dakota 308 (1951)
 The Sleepwalker (1951)
 Boum sur Paris (1953)
 Little Jacques (1953)
 The Tour of the Grand Dukes (1953)
 At the Order of the Czar (1954)
 Dangerous Turning (1954)
 The Price of Love (1955)
 Ramuntcho (1959)
 Les Tortillards (1960)

References
Composers and Lyricists Database: Louiguy
New York Times movies
Representative filmography

1916 births
1991 deaths
Musicians from Barcelona
French male composers
Composers from Catalonia
Spanish people of Italian descent
20th-century French composers
20th-century Spanish musicians
20th-century French male musicians
Spanish male musicians
Spanish emigrants to France